Street Punk is the second studio album from American punk rock band Hunx and His Punx. It was released in July 2013 under Hardly Art Records.

Track listing

References

2013 albums
Hunx and His Punx albums